Episimus utilis is a moth of the family Tortricidae. It was first described by Elwood Zimmerman in 1978. It is native to Brazil, but has been introduced to Hawaii in 1954 to aid in the control of Christmas berry or Brazilian peppertree.

The larvae feed in pods of Schinus terebinthifolius. They web together and feed upon the leaves of their host plant. Full-grown larvae are about 15 mm long and pale, sometimes tinged with reddish or bright red.

The pupa is 6.5–7 mm long.

External links

Olethreutini